Daturaolone is a pentacyclic oleanane triterpenoid, also known as 3-oxo-6-β-hydroxy-β-amyrin, found in Datura species such as Datura stramonium and Datura innoxia.

History 
It was isolated for the first time from Solanum arundo.

Structure 
Daturaolone contains five rings with a ketone group and a hydroxyl group, which may be essential for its bioactivities. The structure was deduced through mass spectroscopy and 1H NMR spectroscopy.

Functions 
Daturaolone isolated from Datura metel Linnaeus has been found to have anti-fungal and anti-bacterial activities. When tested against bacterial strains such as Klebsiella pneumoniae and S. aureus, daturaolone was shown to inhibit bacterial growth.

See also 
 Scopine
 Daturadiol
 Withametelin

References 

Triterpenes